Marcel Fässler may refer to:

Marcel Fässler (bobsledder) (born 1959), Swiss bobsledder who competed in the late 1980s
Marcel Fässler (racing driver) (born 1976), Swiss touring car and A1GP racing driver